Richard C. Kessler is an entrepreneur in the field of hotel development and operations. Kessler has been Chairman and CEO of The Kessler Enterprise, Inc. since 1984. He is also Former Chairman, President and CEO, Days Inn of America, Inc. and Former Chairman of Lutheran Brotherhood.

In 1984, Kessler founded The Kessler Enterprise which consists of several wholly owned subsidiaries consisting of development and operational companies. Some of these projects include The Kessler Collection of themed hotels and resorts, the 500-acre Silverwood Plantation residential community, the 1,000-acre Georgia North International Industrial Park, and commercial land developments, including Plant Riverside District.

Personal history
Kessler was born in Savannah, Georgia and is a descendant of the Salzburgers, a group of Lutherans from Salzburg (Austria) who came to America in 1732 seeking religious freedom.

Kessler holds bachelor's and master's degrees in industrial engineering and operations research from the Georgia Institute of Technology. He is married to Martha Jane Wilson of Durham, N.C. The couple has two grown children, Mark and Laura, and three grandchildren.

At the age of 23, Kessler became the right hand to real estate developer Cecil B. Day and help found Days Inn of America in August 1970. From 1972 to 1975, Kessler founded and led five real estate development and operational companies. In May 1975, at age 29, Kessler became President and CEO of Days Inns, and one year later, Chairman. The chain was sold in 1984 and Kessler began his own independent ventures.

Kessler Collection Hotels
The Kessler Collection owns, operates and creates hotels, each with its own unique theme.  All of the hotels are part of the Marriott Autograph Collection Hotels marketing program, central reservation system and national sales, public relations offices, and technical services

Past developments

 Days Inn Resort & Suites / Sheraton Safari Resort, Orlando, FL – Developed as a themed hotel in 1995; sold December 1996
 Sheraton Studio City Hotel, Orlando, FL – Renovated and opened June 1999; sold August 2007
 Kehoe House Bed & Breakfast, Savannah, GA – Renovated and opened October 2003; sold June 2007 
  Mansion on Forsyth Park, Savannah, GA - Renovated and opened in 2005

Philanthropy

New Ebenezer Retreat & Conference Center
Kessler is the Founder and Chairman of the New Ebenezer Retreat and Conference Center in New Ebenezer, Georgia. Founded in 1736, the township of New Ebenezer was settled by a group of Lutheran Salzburgers seeking a new beginning and a place of religious freedom.  Much of the town was destroyed by the British during the Revolutionary War and later by Union soldiers in the Civil War.  In 1972 Kessler spearheaded efforts to rebuild the essence of the town.  New Ebenezer, has been reconstructed to resemble the original 1700s township.  The new Ebenezer Retreat and Conference Center has space for group meetings of up to 400 people opening summer of 1976.  Each year 25,000 guests can participate in tennis, swimming, canoeing, volleyball, basketball, and hiking.  Kessler retired from the Board after serving 30 years as Chairman.

Treutlen House at New Ebenezer
Kessler spearheaded the founding of the Treutlen House at New Ebenezer in New Ebenezer, Georgia, 20 miles north of Savannah, Georgia.  Opened in 2000, adjacent to the site of the first organized orphanage in America, Treutlen House provides care, housing, support, and guidance to abused children.  Initially, the program’s live-in facility housed 10 children.

Kessler New Ebenezer Trust
Kessler established the Kessler New Ebenezer Trust in 1984 with funds in excess of $1 million.  The trust continues to support the conference center, the Treutlen House, and its programming and related activities.

Georgia Tech Plaza / The Campanile
In the early 1990s, Kessler led the committee effort which designed and created the "Tech Plaza" in the heart of Georgia Tech's campus. He then commissioned the Kessler Campanile, a $450,000 carillon created by Atlanta artist Richard Hill. The 80 foot, stainless steel high tech tower is positioned in a 100-inch diameter fountain and an assortment of 100 different songs chime on the quarter-hour.

During the 1996 Olympics, the set of NBC’s "Today Show" was centered directly in front of the Campanile, providing international exposure. Today, the Kessler Campanile is used by Georgia Tech as their 21st Century Logo.

The Kessler Reformation Collection
Kessler chairs the Committee for the Richard C. Kessler Reformation Collection, an assembly of over 3,600 pieces of rare works, all dating pre-1570. in Pitts Theology Library, on the campus of Atlanta’s Emory University. It is one of the largest theological libraries in the United States with nearly 130,000 items in the rare book and archive collection alone.   Kessler founded the collection in November, 1987, and funded its growth in partnership with Emory University.  Considered a national treasure, the collection boasts many one-of-a-kind pieces and is a valuable resource for churches and religious scholars.  It holds the largest collection in the U.S. of 1,000 pieces of original writings of Martin Luther.

Kessler scholarships
The Kessler family has established the following scholarships for outstanding professionals and students:
 Excellence in Teaching Award – Pace Academy, Atlanta, GA 
 Georgia Institute of Technology 
 4-H Club Leadership Award
 Lutheran Theological Southern Seminary
 Excellence in Teaching Art & Music, Orange

References

Further reading
 Mervin, Bob. "Art for the Art's Sake." Executive Living. April–May 2007. Pg. 20-24.
 Georgia Tech Alumni Magazine Summer 1996
 Wittish, Rich. From Marbles to Mansions. Savannah Magazine July/August 2004 pg. 58-63
 McKechnie, Gary and Howell, N. Kessler's Kingdom. Orlando Magazine April 1997 pg. 66-67
 Salter, Salley. The Atlanta Journal.  Richard Kessler: Business Man with a Sense of History. March 24, 1986. Section C.
 Rauen, Stacy S. Hospitality Design. Perspectives Interview: Richard Kessler. July 2011. Pg. 69-70.
 Elliott, Daniel T. "Effingham County's Historical Archaeological Resources."

Living people
1946 births
People from Savannah, Georgia
Georgia Tech alumni
American chief executives of travel and tourism industry companies
American hoteliers